Little Dolores River is a  tributary that flows into the Colorado River in Grand County, Utah from a source in Mesa County, Colorado.

See also
 List of rivers of Colorado
 List of tributaries of the Colorado River

References

Rivers of Colorado
Rivers of Mesa County, Colorado
Tributaries of the Colorado River in Colorado